KNWI, (107.1 FM, "Life 107.1") is a Contemporary Christian radio station, licensed to Osceola, Iowa and serving the Des Moines metropolitan area.  It is owned and operated by University of Northwestern – St. Paul in Roseville, Minnesota, a religious university which owns a chain of radio stations around the U.S.

History

The station first signed on the air on October 1, 1982.  The call sign was KJJC and the station played country music.  It was owned by J. B. Broadcasting, Inc. and it was only powered at 3,000 watts, unable to be heard in the larger Des Moines radio market.

Signal upgrades 

Despite targeting Des Moines for decades, the city was outside the station's city-grade contour. In 2018, UNW proposed a modification to KNWI to upgrade it to 100 kW from a tower near Winterset. The move required KDSN-FM 107.1 in Denison to move to 104.9; in order to assure approval, UNW Northwestern subsidiary UNW Media Holdings LLC reached an agreement to buy KDSN-FM and its associated AM KDSN 1530 from Mikadety Radio Corporation for $1.25 million. (In September 2018, UNW Media divested the KDSN stations to JC Van Ginkel, James Field, & Rodney Christensen's Crawford County Broadcasting for $1.15 million.) The frequency changes were approved by the FCC on August 12, 2019. In October of 2021, KNWI officially made the upgrade to 100,000 watts, and as a result, KNWM 96.1 in Madrid dropped the KNWI simulcast.

References

External links
 Life 107.1 KNWI / 96.1 KNWM Home Page

NWI
Radio stations established in 1983
Northwestern Media
NWI